Sarıkavak (literally "yellow poplar") is a Turkish place name and may refer to:

 Sarıkavak, Çameli
 Sarıkavak, Çamlıdere,  a village in Çamlıdere district of Ankara Province, Turkey
 Sarıkavak, Çamlıyayla, a village in Çamlıyayla district of Mersin Province, Turkey
 Sarıkavak, Dazkırı,  a village in Dazkırı district of Afyonkarahisar Province, Turkey
 Sarıkavak, İskilip
 Sarıkavak, Taşköprü, a village in Turkey
 The former name of Kumluca district of Antalya Province, Turkey
 Another name for Kürkçü, Mut, a village in Mut district of Mersin Province, Turkey